Tracey Johnston-Aldworth is a Canadian businesswoman and entrepreneur, based in the Waterloo region of Ontario, who is known for her public service and environmental activism. Her firm Traces Printing, founded in 1985 and emphasizing employee profit-sharing, was lauded for its efforts to recycle materials, reduce energy consumption, save water, and use ink efficiently.  She was recognized by the Government of Ontario for her work promoting environmentalism and sustainability. Her firm was featured in a 1995 documentary Stop Waste From Adding Up.

References 

1957 births
Businesspeople from Kitchener, Ontario
Canadian environmentalists
Canadian women environmentalists
Living people
OCAD University alumni
Sustainability advocates